The Ministry of Finances and Economy is a department of the Albanian Government, responsible for matters relating to economic policy, the central government budget, taxes, banking, security and insurance, international economic work, central, regional and local government.

On 13 September 2017, the ministry was restructured by joining the Department of Economy, which was part of the Ministry of Economic Development, Tourism, Trade and Enterprise.

History

Early period

It is one of the first departments created immediately after the independence of the Albania as part of the Provisional Government of Ismail Qemali formed on 5 December 1912. The first minister of Finance was appointed Abdi Toptani, where under his leadership were established the first financial institutions of the country, such as the establishment of the Bank of Albania on 4 October 1913, although this lasted for a few months. During the first government, the first fiscal laws were approved for customs tariffs, import and export taxes, etc.

With the start of the Second Balkan War and the separatist rebellions of Essad Pasha Toptani, the Great Powers offered the crown of Albania to Prince Wilhelm of Wied, which he accepted on 7 March 1914. In the governments formed by him, Gaqo Adhamidhi, and later Filip Noga were appointed Minister of Finance. Nothing significant in terms of finances happened, given the situation with the control in the territory and the rebellions of different areas during this period.

Only after the Congress of Lushnjë held from 28 to 31 January 1920 and after the mandate of the Delvina Government or as it is otherwise known National Government, the Ministry of Finances headquarters moved to Tirana. Ndoc Çoba was appointed Minister of Finances. During the following years, the so-called Financial Directorates were established in Shkodër, Durrës, Elbasan, Gjirokastër, Korçë, and Vlorë, as well as financial offices in other cities. Laws banning the export of gold, silver, and cereals also came into force. The Customs Directorate was also established and the collection of customs tariffs on goods began. Then the law on the minting of the first Albanian banknote. The merits for the financial reforms of these years have Ndoc Çoba, Ahmet Dakli, Kol Thaçi, as well as the first General Director of the Albanian Customs, Ahmet Boriçi.

Zog Presidency and the Second Albanian Kingdom
With the overthrow of Noli's government, Ahmet Zogu returned to power for the second time. On 25 January 1925, the Constitutional Assembly proclaimed the Republic of Albania, until then de jure continued to be the kingdom proclaimed in 1914 by the Great Powers. On 1 February 1925, Ahmet Zogu was elected President of Albania, being at the same time the head of the executive power. During this time, he restored stability in the country, as well as enabled the signing of important economic, political, and military agreements that strengthened the position of Albania.

At the beginning of 1925, a series of developments started for the Albanian economy, both positive and negative. Initiatives began to organize joint-stock companies in the field of industry, construction, transport. In the same year, the first Albanian currency, the Albanian Franga, was created. The introduction of foreign capital became the official policy of Zog's governments, which internally aimed to strengthen his power. He also used the granting of foreign capital concessions as a means of securing income for the regime, in the form of loans and rents, which was later thought of as a way out of the economic crisis.

Between 1925 and 1927 it is considered that 14 new companies were created, while in 1928, the number of enterprises reached 127. The domestic capital was 6 times larger than in 1927, making in this period partial stability of the economy was achieved.

The main feature of this period is the conclusion of agreements between the government of Tirana and Italian financial groups to invest in the country. Thus, in 1925 between the Albanian government of that time and the Italian financial group was signed the loan agreement of S.V.E.A where 96.4% of it was used by the Ministry of Public Works for road construction. This was done not only for the economic needs of the country but to create conditions for the penetration of foreign capital.

Trade was the main field of the Albanian economy. During this period the turnover of goods increased. Agricultural and livestock raw materials were mainly exported.

Many Italian, English, French and American companies began to be present in the Albanian economy through concession agreements or direct investments. Such as: SISMA (Societa Italiana Sfrutamento Miniere Albania); SEIA (Societa Electrica Italo-Albanese); ALBA (Azienda Lavori Boschi Albania); EIAA (Ente Italiano Attivita Agraria); SESA, which received the electricity concession in 7 cities in Albania; Anglo-Persian Oil Company; the American company Standard Oil Co.; Franco-Albanian kerosene union; German company INAG for forest use etc.

During the period 1925-1926, 23% of the territory of Albania was included in the concessions granted to foreign capital by the governments of Zog presidency. This gave a further impetus to the country's economy, which experienced some modest but still evident development in the period 1925-1928.

After the early elections on 25 August 1928, a change of form of government was proposed, the Statutory Commission proposed a change of form of the regime from a republic to a monarchy. On 1 September 1928, the Constituent Assembly proclaimed: Ahmet Zogu "King of the Albanians" under the name Zog I. At this time, the Basic Statute, the Civil Code, and the Commercial Code were adopted.

In 1929, the whole world would be gripped by the Great Depression caused by overproduction. Albania would not escape its effects either. It was exactly this year when the first signs of this crisis were seen, mainly in the monetary and financial system of the country, but they became more sensitive in 1930 and reached their peak in 1934-1935.

To mitigate the effects of the crisis of the continuous budget deficit and financial difficulties that were evidenced in many areas and sectors, many loans and credits were taken from Western countries, mostly from Italy. The bank reduced the amount of currency in circulation and deepened deflation. It artificially increased the value of the franc and which resulted in products' lower prices.

In the middle of 1935, Albania entered a phase of revival. The industry recovered. Zog created some fiscal facilities especially for the cement factory, which was exempt from taxes for three years.

Reorganization
Since the establishment of the institution, the Ministry of Finances has undergone several administrative changes to its organizational structure. When a new department was formed, it often merged with the ministry thus expanding its role, subsequently leading to the name of the ministry being changed. If that department later broke off as a separate ministry or was dissolved, the ministry reverted to its original name.

 Ministry of Finances (1912–1939)
 Minister State Secretary of Finances (1939–1943)
 Ministry of Finances (1944–1992)
 Ministry of Finances and Economy (1992–1993)
 Ministry of Finances (1993–2017)
 Ministry of Finances and Economy (2017–present)

Subordinate institutions
 General Directorate of Taxation
 General Directorate of Customs
 General Directorate for the Prevention of Money Laundering
 First Society of Financial Development
 Gambling Oversight Unit
 National Business Center
 Agency for the Administration of Confiscated Assets
 Credit Handling Agency
 General Directorate of Industrial Property
 Administrator of Borrowing Corporations
 Training Center for the Administration of Taxation and Customs

Officeholders (1912–present)

Notes

See also
Taxation in Albania
List of banks in Albania

Sources

References

Finance
Politics of Albania
1912 establishments in Albania
Albania